Jen Beagin is an American novelist and writer.

Life and career

Early life and education 
Beagin grew up in Torrance, California, and moved to Lowell, Massachusetts, in her youth. She returned to college in her mid-30s, and attended the University of Massachusetts Boston. She earned an MFA in Writing from the University of California, Irvine.

Professional life 
Among other jobs, Beagin was a long time housecleaner. This inspired the character of Mona, who is the housecleaner protagonist of her first two books.

Published works

Pretend I'm Dead (2015) 
Pretend I’m Dead, her first novel, received a starred review from Kirkus Reviews which also noted it among the Best Fiction of 2018. Pretend I’m Dead was shortlisted for The Center for Fiction’s 2018 First Novel Prize. The popular website Emily Books gave an early positive review of the book, the first edition of which was published by Northwestern University Press in 2015. The novel was reissued as a hardcover in 2018 by Simon & Schuster.

Vacuum in the Dark (2019) 
Vacuum in the Dark, a sequel to Pretend I’m Dead, received a starred Kirkus review and was named a best book for February 2019 by Oprah Magazine. Publishers Weekly has a starred review, calling it "a sharp and superb novel" that "pulls no punches—this novel is viciously smart and morbidly funny."

Big Swiss (2023) 
Big Swiss is about a woman who transcribes sex therapy sessions and how she falls for a client Flavia, the titular "Big Swiss".

Publishers Weekly Tip Sheet notes that "This unconventional love story has a surplus of appeal from page one."

Critical reception 
Entertainment Weekly said: "Beagin stands out among fiction’s fresh crop of promising voices." NPR Books says that "Beagin is a wonderfully funny writer who also happens to tackle serious subjects."

Awards and nominations

Awards 

 2017: Whiting Award for fiction
 2018: Pretend I’m Dead nominated to shortlist for the Center for Fiction’s 2018 First Novel Prize.
 2019: Vacuum in the Dark nominated to shortlist for the Bollinger Everyman Wodehouse Prize for Comic Fiction.

Bibliography

Novels

 
 
 Big Swiss

Short fiction

Essays

See also

Articles

Excerpts 

"Yoko and Yoko" excerpt from Pretend I'm Dead (2016)
Excerpt from "Hole" in Pretend I'm Dead (2015)
"Poop" excerpt from Vacuum in the Dark (2019)

Interviews and readings

References 

Living people
American women novelists
University of Massachusetts Boston alumni
University of California, Irvine alumni
Year of birth missing (living people)
21st-century American women
21st-century American novelists
1971 births